Aýdere is a village in the Kopet Dag mountains of south-western Turkmenistan, in Kürüždeý geňeşligi, Magtymguly District,
Balkan Province near the border with Iran. Aýdere is on the Sumbar River near its confluence with the Aýdere River.

References

Populated places in Balkan Region